Four Feathers (1915) is a silent film adaptation of A. E. W. Mason's 1902 novel The Four Feathers.

Plot
Harry Faversham (played by John Clements) is British army officer who refuses to avenge the death of a legendary general who was murdered some ten years ago. He is awarded three feathers by his officers. When his fiancée fails to defend his stance, he plucks a feather from her fan.

He proves his courage by recusing his comrades in potentially dangerous and life-threatening situations at enemy lines in North Africa. Harry later returns each of the feathers as proof of his redemption and courage.

Cast
 Edgar L. Davenport as General Faversham
 Fuller Mellish as Lieutenant Sutch
 Ogden Childe as Harry Faversham, age 14
 Howard Estabrook as Captain Harry Faversham
 Arthur Evers as Captain Jack Durrance
 George Moss (actor) as Mr. Eustace
 Irene Warfield as Ethne Eustace

References

External links
 
 
 

Films based on The Four Feathers
1915 films
1915 adventure films
American black-and-white films
Films directed by J. Searle Dawley
American silent feature films
American adventure films
Metro Pictures films
1910s American films
Silent adventure films
Silent war films
Silent American drama films
Films about the British Army
1910s English-language films